Park Ji-min (born 25 May 2000) is a South Korean footballer currently playing as a goalkeeper for Suwon Samsung Bluewings.

Career statistics

Club

Honours

International

South Korea U20
FIFA U-20 World Cup runner-up: 2019

References

2000 births
Living people
South Korean footballers
Association football goalkeepers
K League 1 players
K League 2 players
Suwon Samsung Bluewings players
Gimcheon Sangmu FC players
People from Suwon
Sportspeople from Gyeonggi Province
South Korea under-20 international footballers